Packages from Planet X is an animated television series produced by DHX Media Vancouver and American Greetings. The series premiered on Disney XD on July 13, 2013 and later on Teletoon and Télétoon on January 16, 2014 as part of their "Can't Miss Thursday" lineup. The show ended on February 24, 2014.

Characters

Main characters
 Daniel Aloysius "Dan" Zembrosky (voiced by Vincent Tong) is the sixteen-year-old main protagonist who typically hangs out with his best friends Amanda and Troll. Since he started receiving packages, Dan has taken on a slight hero role. There have been multiple occasions where he uses them to his advantage in the group's everyday lives, but he still always comes through.
 Amanda Highborn (voiced by Britt Irvin) is the genius of the group due to her uncle Rory leaving her a journal telling her about the packages and what do they do. Her uncle's disappearance has made Amanda suspicious about everyone in Iron Bay being aliens and made her determined to find Rory. It was revealed in "A Night at West Iron High" that Amanda was afraid of dolls. It's well known that her mother is obsessed with shoes and tries to make her a pageant girl. She was responsible for CuRT being damaged and feels guilty for whenever she makes a mistake.
 Troll Moko (voiced by Ty Olsson) is Dan's best friend and his right-hand man. Like Dan, Troll usually acts first and asks questions later when it comes to packages. He respects all nature and animals, except racoons (due to one of his ancestors being a raccoon hunter). Despite Troll’s obese weight and big appetite, it's been shown on rare occasions that he is a great cook and that he's freakishly very strong and athletic.
 Corvis Copernicus/Leepthor (voiced by Brian Drummond) is the series' main antagonist who constantly tries to take the packages back from Dan, cocoon everyone in Iron Bay and take over Earth in the name of Planet X. When he first came to the planet, Leepthor took over Copernicus' body and used him as a cover so he won't be exposed. It was once hinted that Leepthor was Rory's rival. He was temporarily sent back to Planet X in the season one finale, but was placed back on the Earth mission.
 Calimary (voiced by Tabitha St. Germain) is a mutated squibbon (a monkey with giant squid arms attached to her back) who is Copernicus' sidekick and his first mutant creation. Despite her cravings for banana fish and her slight stupidity, Copernicus considers her his closest friend. Calimary temporarily teamed up with Troll in "Mission to Planet X" and considered joining Dan's group, but Troll, seeing Copernicus needed her more than them, let Calimary return to serving her master.

Recurring characters
 CuRT is a robot assistant, the keeper of the group's packages at the abandoned observatory and the 1st package Dan ever received. He has a huge dent on his head, which results in him speaking in riddles. In "CuRT meets BuRT", it's revealed that Amanda was responsible for CuRT's damage as she kicked him in the head.
 Duane Zembrovsky (voiced by Colin Murdock) is Dan's father and the owner of the family's bait shop in the docks. He knows his son would rather hang out with his friends than work in the shop or do something Dan knows is humiliating, and as a result constantly guilt trips him. In "Mission to Planet X", Duane was taken over by an alien stronger than Copernicus and nearly cocooned the whole town but was stopped by Troll, CuRT and Calimary.
 Mrs. Zembrovsky (voiced by Nicole Oliver) is Dan's mother. She runs a daycare class at her house.
 Terrance Buckshot (voiced by Kyle Rideout) is West Iron High's bully who tends to mess with Dan. This usually results in Dan using the package he recently received to one up him. Although Terrance usually comes out on top, he always gets his comeuppance.
 Mr. Dooley (voiced by Michael Daingerfield) is the science teacher to West Iron High who resembles the typical strict teacher. He tends to fail Dan either because he goofs off or just for the fun of it. Although both Amanda and Troll don’t cause that much trouble for Mr. Dooley on a regular daily basis as in the case of Dan, Mr. Dooley does tend to be harsh with them two as well. But unlike how Mr. Dooley deals with Dan, Mr. Dooley does sometimes have a soft side for Amanda and Troll (especially with the former being a straight-A student), and every time that he's really being harsh on the two is usually just for the fun of it. The trio once suspected him of working with Copernicus, but was later revealed to be hiring him as the new janitor.
 Overlord is the main official of Planet X's leaders and one of three aliens who constantly check on Copernicus's progress. He find him incompetent but is continuously fooled by Dan into thinking Copernicus has taken over earth.
 Rory is Amanda's uncle who disappeared leaving his journal behind for his niece to find but in reality, he was taken prisoner on Planet X and escaped Overlord's prison. He was constantly mentioned by Amanda throughout the first season until he appeared in "Mission to Planet X: Part 1" wearing glasses and a cloak. In Part 2, he bumped into Amanda and disappeared. It was later revealed that he slipped a note in his journal telling his niece he was alive and collecting intel on Planet X. He also gave her plans for a new interceptor so Dan could start receiving packages again.
 Mrs. Highborn is Amanda's mother. She's been trying to get Amanda to do girly things like wanting her to dress all pretty, wants her to hang out with female friends, and giving her dolls to play with that cause Amanda to fear dolls. When Amanda learns there's an alien in the beauty pageant and Amanda needs to get in, she calls her mom and Amanda's mom zips right to her all happy that Amanda is doing some girl activity.
 Mr. and Mrs. Moko are Troll's parents. They run a fishing market and catch fish in the ocean. They appear to be good friends with Dan's father seeing how he runs a bait shop and they come to buy some bait for fishing.

Episodes

Production

Originally planned as a feature film, the idea of the series came from Jeff Harter after several weeks of research and revisiting what he liked as a 10 year old kid: Sci-fi, comic books, superheroes, robots, space ships, aliens, monsters, and anything to do with Outer Space. The idea of where the packages came from on Planet X was one of those old novelty toy ads he noticed.

Reception 

The series received a mixed reception. Joyce Slaton of Common Sense Media described the series as an iffy, fast-paced animated series, with "rude humor" and "alien gadgets" coupled with cartoon violence. She further argued that some young children might be "intimidated or overstimulated by the fast pace."

References

External links 
Packages from Planet X at the Internet Movie Database
 

2010s American animated television series
2013 American television series debuts
2014 American television series endings
2010s Canadian animated television series
2014 Canadian television series debuts
2015 Canadian television series endings
American children's animated action television series
American children's animated adventure television series
American children's animated science fantasy television series
American flash animated television series
Canadian children's animated action television series
Canadian children's animated adventure television series
Canadian children's animated science fantasy television series
Canadian flash animated television series
English-language television shows
Disney XD original programming
Teletoon original programming
Television series by DHX Media
Teen animated television series